Troglav (Serbian Cyrillic: Троглав) is a mountain in central Serbia, near the city of Kraljevo. Its highest peak Kom has an elevation of 1,178 meters above sea level.

References

External links
 Čemerno i Troglav, November 2005. PD "Pobeda" 

Mountains of Serbia